Colin Anthony Cole (born June 24, 1980) is a former American football defensive tackle who played in the National Football League (NFL). He was signed by the Minnesota Vikings as an undrafted free agent in 2003. He played college football at Iowa.

Early years
Born in Toronto, Ontario, Canada, Cole moved to Florida at the age of 5. He attended South Plantation High School, where he excelled in football and wrestling. He was named second-team all-state in football, and won the state wrestling title as a senior defeating John Ufferfilge in the state finals. And on Friday, October 24, 2008 his football jersey number (number 34) was officially retired at South Plantation High School, only the second number in school history to be retired besides All-Pro Linebacker, Bobby Michelin.

College career
Cole went to the University of Iowa on a football scholarship.

Professional career

Green Bay Packers
Upon graduation Cole played on the practice squad of the Detroit Lions and Minnesota Vikings before being signed to the active roster by the Packers.

The Packers extended a second-round ($1.417 million) tender to Cole a restricted free agent . Cole needed this higher tender because he was originally undrafted.

Cole was re-signed by the Green Bay Packers on April 17, 2008.

Cole became an Unrestricted Free Agent on February 27, 2009.

Seattle Seahawks
Cole was signed by the Seattle Seahawks on March 1, 2009; his five-year contract is worth $21.4 million, including $6 million in guaranteed money.

Carolina Panthers
Cole was signed by the Carolina Panthers on February 8, 2013, after being out of the NFL for nearly two years for one year, $840,000 and no guaranteed money. On April 8, 2014, the Panthers resigned Cole for a 1-year deal. Cole was cut on October 1, 2015.

References

External links
Green Bay Packers bio

1980 births
Living people
American football defensive tackles
Black Canadian players of American football
Canadian emigrants to the United States
Carolina Panthers players
Detroit Lions players
Green Bay Packers players
Gridiron football people from Ontario
Iowa Hawkeyes football players
Minnesota Vikings players
People from Plantation, Florida
Sportspeople from Toronto
Players of American football from Florida
Seattle Seahawks players
South Plantation High School alumni
Sportspeople from Broward County, Florida